Bernardo Poli (27 March 1915 – 2 March 1944) was an Italian professional football player. He was killed in action during World War II.

Honours
 Serie A champion: 1939/40.

References

1915 births
1944 deaths
Italian footballers
Serie A players
Calcio Padova players
Brescia Calcio players
A.C. Milan players
Inter Milan players
Spezia Calcio players
Association football defenders
Regia Aeronautica personnel of World War II
Italian military personnel killed in World War II
Accidental deaths in Italy